The Bellanca YO-50 was a United States prototype observation aircraft, built for the United States Army in 1940.  Typical for aircraft of its type, it was a high-wing braced monoplane with fixed tailwheel undercarriage and extensive cabin glazing. Its inverted "V" engine made it resemble its German equivalent, the Fieseler Storch.

Three examples were purchased for evaluation against the Stinson YO-49 and Ryan YO-51 Dragonfly. The Stinson won the production contract, and no further YO-50s were built.

Specifications

See also

References

 
 
 aerofiles.com

1940s United States military reconnaissance aircraft
O-050
Single-engined tractor aircraft
High-wing aircraft
Aircraft first flown in 1940